Scotch-Brite is a line of abrasive products produced by 3M. The product line includes scouring pads and tools for home uses such as dish washing and scrubbing, as well as various types of surfaces for industrial applications, such as discs, belts, and rotating brushes, with varying compositions and levels of hardness.

The structure of Scotch-Brite pads is created by a sparse unwoven polymer such as cellulose, nylon or spun polypropylene fiber. Products use several variations of hardening and abrasive materials, such as aluminum oxide (alumina), titanium dioxide and resins. Although the base polymers may be considered benignly soft, the composition with other materials greatly enhances their abrasive powers; to the extent that a heavy-duty Scotch-Brite pad (which contains both aluminum oxide and titanium dioxide) will scratch glass.

History
Scotch-Brite was introduced during the 1950s. Development continues into the 21st century with new products for various cleaning uses.

Scotch-Brite, and similar abrasives, have largely replaced the use of bronze wool, which had been used as a non-rusting alternative to steel wool, for use on materials such as oak that would be sensitive to rust.

References

External links
 
 Comparison of pad types

Cleaning products
3M brands